A military cabinet is any cabinet composed of members of the military. It may be an advisory body (staff) to a sovereign, head of government or other functionary, such as a minister of war, or it may be the executive cabinet of a military government.
Military Cabinet (Prussia), the German emperor's privy council concerning army personnel matters

In France, both the prime minister and the minister of defence have their own military cabinets (cabinets militaires).
Head of the Prime Minister's military cabinet
Head of the Minister of Defence's military cabinet
Historically, the rulers of France's colonies, such as the Resident-General in Morocco and the Governor-General of Indochina, had their own military cabinets.

Notes

Civil–military relations
Government institutions
Militarism